Scott Ollerenshaw (born 9 February 1968) is a former Australian association football player, best known for his appearances for his country's national side in the late 1980s and as a successful import player in Malaysia in the 1990s who scored against Manchester United on their 1995 Asian tour.

Club career
A prominent forward and winger, Scott Ollerenshaw played for several clubs including St George Saints and Sydney Olympic in Australia's National Soccer League before heading overseas. He had a season with Walsall FC in England before becoming a popular overseas player for Sabah FA in Malaysia's M-League. Scoring more than a goal a game in four seasons with Sabah FA, Ollerenshaw twice won the Malaysian Golden Boot and earned the nickname 'The Ginger Maradona'. After returning home to Australia to join National Soccer League club, Northern Spirit FC, a serious hip injury forced him to retire at the age of 31.

Scoring against Manchester United
Ollerenshaw scored a famous goal against Manchester United on their Asian pre-season tour for the 1995-96 season. Although a Sabah player at the time, Ollerenshaw represented Selangor FA against a star-studded United side that included Eric Cantona and David Beckham. His left-footed strike beat Peter Schmeichel in the 4-1 defeat in front of 50,000 fans at Shah Alam Stadium on July 31, 1995 at the start of a season that would see the Red Devils win the Premier_League title under Alex_Ferguson.

International career
As a 19-year-old, Ollerenshaw was capped in 1987 by his St George Saints manager Frank Arok who was also the national coach. Ollerenshaw played in the 1988 Gold Cup in Sydney, which marked the Australian Bicentenary and included a shock 4–1 victory over Argentina. Later that year, Ollerenshaw also played in the football tournament at the 1988 Summer Olympic Games in Seoul, South Korea.

Post-playing career
After retirement, Ollerenshaw has run his own sports tourism business in Sabah, specialising in organising junior and senior football tours and tournaments, including the annual Borneo Cup. Since 2021, he has been the technical and sporting director for his former club, Sabah.

He has also helped football development in Malaysia throught the recruitment of mixed heritage players from overseas to strengthen Malaysian clubs and the national team. These talented footballers, who have mostly been raised abroad with a Malaysian parent, include national team players Junior_Eldstål, Brendan Gan, Samuel_Somerville_(footballer), Matthew Davies and Darren Lok. His overseas connections also helped the Malaysian U23 team compete in Queensland's NPL to aid with their development and assisted Australia_men%27s_national_soccer_team players Bernie Ibini, Daniel McBreen and Adam Griffiths to find clubs in Asia.

A familiar face in the Malaysian media, Ollerenshaw appeared as a Premier_League and FIFA_World_Cup pundit on Astro_SuperSport between 2009 and 2014.

References

External links

Season 1991/1992 in detail

1968 births
Living people
Sportsmen from New South Wales
Australian expatriate soccer players
Australia international soccer players
Australian expatriate sportspeople in England
Olympic soccer players of Australia
Footballers at the 1988 Summer Olympics
National Soccer League (Australia) players
APIA Leichhardt FC players
Negeri Sembilan FA players
Sydney Olympic FC players
Walsall F.C. players
Northern Spirit FC players
Expatriate footballers in Malaysia
Sabah F.C. (Malaysia) players
Soccer players from Sydney
Association football forwards
Australian soccer players